Blacks Corners, Ontario may refer to:
Blacks Corners, Dufferin County, Ontario
Blacks Corners, Lanark County, Ontario